The 2019 AFL draft consisted of the various periods where the 18 clubs in the Australian Football League (AFL) can trade and recruit players following the completion of the 2019 AFL season.

Key dates

Mid-season rookie draft 

The first mid-season draft since 1993 was held after Round 10 of the 2019 AFL season on 27 May. The draft was only open to clubs with inactive players on their list and vacancies available, such as long term injuries or retirements. Players recruited during the mid-season draft earned a contract for the remainder of the season, though had the option of negotiating terms for an extension at any period throughout the season.

Previous trades 
Since 2015, clubs have been able to trade future picks in the next year's national draft during the trade period. As a result, a total of 34 selections for the 2019 draft were traded during the 2018 trade period, including (for the first time) at the 2018 National Draft, where 14 picks were traded. The selection order for each of these picks is tied to the original club's finishing position in the 2019 season.

Free agency

Trades

Retirements and delistings

Gold Coast concessions 

 The first pick of the first round of the 2019 National Draft (pick #1).
 The first pick of the second round of the 2021 AFL draft (pick #19, since traded to ).
 Darwin was added to its Academy zone 
 The ability to be able to pre-list Academy players.
 An expanded Category A rookie list of up to ten players, with the club having a maximum roster of 53 players.

2019 national draft 

  are carrying over a points deficit from the 2018 AFL draft (Kieren Briggs selection, #34), this deficit is offset by surplus points from the 2015 AFL draft (Jacob Hopper selection, #7), moving this pick from third round (58) to fourth round (60).

Rookie elevations 
Clubs were able to promote any player who was listed on their rookie list in 2019 to their 2020 primary playing list prior to the draft.

2020 pre-season draft

The 2020 pre-season draft was held on the morning of Friday, 29 November 2019 prior to the commencement of the rookie draft.

2020 rookie draft

Category B rookie selections 
Clubs were able to nominate category B rookies to join their club in 2020.

Pre-season supplemental selection period

See also 
 2019 AFL Women's draft

References

Australian Football League draft
Draft
AFL Draft
2010s in Melbourne
Australian rules football in Victoria (Australia)
Sport in Melbourne
Events in Melbourne